Silvia Zennaro (born October 26, 1989) is an Italian sailor. She placed 22nd in the Laser Radial event at the 2016 Summer Olympics (22).
She competed at the 2020 Summer Olympics in Tokyo 2021, competing in Laser Radial (7).

References

1989 births
Living people
Italian female sailors (sport)
Olympic sailors of Italy
Sailors at the 2016 Summer Olympics – Laser Radial
Europe class world champions
World champions in sailing for Italy
Mediterranean Games silver medalists for Italy
Competitors at the 2018 Mediterranean Games
Mediterranean Games medalists in sailing
Sailors at the 2020 Summer Olympics – Laser Radial
21st-century Italian women